Fatafehi Fakafānua, known before ascending to his title as Fatafehi Kinikinilau Lolomana‘ia Fakafānua (born 20 March 1985), is a Tongan politician, Lord of the Realm and the  Speaker of the Tongan Legislative Assembly. He is the 8th Fakafānua.

Biography 
He is the son of late Kinikinilau Tūtoatasi, 7th Lord Fakafānua and estate holder of Ma'ufanga, and Princess Sinaitakala 'Ofeina-'e-he-Langi Fakafānua. He has a brother, Fakaola mei Langi ʻItafuaʻatonga Tūtoatasi Fakafānua and a sister, the Crown Princess of Tonga, Sinaitakala Tu'imatamoana 'i Fanakavakilangi Fakafānua.

Through his mother, he is a member of the Tongan royal family and, of her own right, in line to the country's throne.

He was bestowed with the title Fakafānua, one of the thirty-three hereditary titles of the Tongan nobility, in April 2006. The title is attached to the estates of Ma'ufanga (on Tongatapu), Nga'akau (on Vava'u) and Faleloa (on Ha'apai), and enables its holder to be elected to the Legislative Assembly as a Representative of the Nobility. During the 2008 by-election he was elected as a representative for Ha'apai, the youngest member ever of the Tongan Parliament. He was re-elected in the November 2010 general election.

On 19 July 2012 he was elected Speaker of the Tongan Legislative Assembly following Lord Lasike's removal from office, becoming Tonga's youngest ever Speaker. As Speaker he held a "practice parliament" to encourage women to participate in politics. He lost his seat in the 2014 election.

He was elected again in the 2017 election and re-elected Speaker.

Following the 2021 election he was re-elected Speaker.

Personal life
On 1 August 2008, King George Tupou V appointed Fakafānua Commander of the Order of Queen Sālote Tupou III.

On 15 October 2014 he married Krystal Fane Kite, daughter of Tonga's former High Commissioner to the United Kingdom, then Ambassador to the United States, the late Sione Kite.

Honours
National honours
  Knight Commander of the Order of Queen Sālote Tupou III (31 July 2008).

References

1985 births
Members of the Legislative Assembly of Tonga
Speakers of the Legislative Assembly of Tonga
Tongan nobles
Living people
Knight Commanders of the Order of Queen Sālote Tupou III